James Lawson (born 17 January 1995) is a Zimbabwean swimmer. He competed in the men's 50 metre breaststroke event at the 2017 World Aquatics Championships.

Career
Lawson participated at the 2011 All-Africa Games when he qualify 3 individual final (50 & 100 m breaststroke and 200 m medley), and was part of Zimbabwean relay team. Later that year he won 2 gold and 1 bronze medal at the African Junior Swimming Championships at the Port Harcourt, Nigeria.

Major results

Individual

Long course

Relay

Long course

References

External links
 

1995 births
Living people
Zimbabwean male breaststroke swimmers
Zimbabwean male freestyle swimmers
Zimbabwean male medley swimmers
Place of birth missing (living people)
Competitors at the 2011 All-Africa Games
Swimmers at the 2015 African Games
African Games competitors for Zimbabwe
African Games medalists in swimming
African Games bronze medalists for Zimbabwe
21st-century Zimbabwean people
20th-century Zimbabwean people